"Anything But You" is a song written by Aleena Gibson and Stefan Andersson, and performed by Aleena Gibson and Stefan Andersson at Melodifestivalen 2007. Participating in the semifinal in Jönköping on 3 February 2007, it ended up 5th, which meant the song was knocked out of contest.

Released as a single on 7 February 2007, it peaked at 40th position at the Swedish singles chart. The song was also tested at Svensktoppen, entering the chart on 4 March 2007 placing on 10th position. The upcoming week, the song had been knocked out of chart.

Single track listing
Anything But You
Sailorman

Chart trajectories

References

2007 singles
EMI Music Sweden singles
English-language Swedish songs
Melodifestivalen songs of 2007
2007 songs
Songs written by Aleena Gibson
Songs written by Stefan Andersson (singer)